Jackie Lee may refer to:

 Jackie Lee (Irish singer) (born 1936), Irish popular music singer
 Jackie Lee (country singer) (born 1991), American country music singer-songwriter
 Jacky Lee (1938–2016), American Football League and National Football League quarterback
 Jackie Lee, singer, real name Earl Nelson of Bob & Earl